The Monthly Offering was an anti-slavery periodical published between July 1840 and December 1841 from Boston, Massachusetts. Pages were approximately 11x15 inches. The original intent of the publication was to provide poems, music, and information on abolitionist and anti-slavery topics to readers. Another hallmark of the periodical was its commitment to remaining inexpensive; it "could be afforded so low that every one might procure it, who had a desire to become acquainted with the nature and influence of slavery, and the means employed for its removal." The Monthly Offering was one of many American anti-slavery publications including The Liberator, Freedom's Journal, and Facts For The People.

Author and contributors 
The Monthly Offering is credited to John A Collins (1810-1879), an abolitionist born in Manchester, Vermont. Collins attended Middlebury College, joined the Andover Theological Seminary, and eventually left both to work in the anti-slavery movement. From 1840-1842, Collins served as the General Agent and Vice President of the Massachusetts Anti-Slavery Society (MASS, founded 1835), a Boston branch of the American Anti-Slavery Society. Collins also edited a newspaper called Monthly Garland.

The Monthly Offering also featured writings from other authors, including Maria Weston Chapman.

Present 
The Monthly Offering now exists in book compilations. It has been republished for historical preservation purposes under the title "The Monthly Offering 1841."

There is a physical copy located in the Albert and Shirley Small Special Collections Library at the University of Virginia. It is also available on Google Books.

References

External links
The Monthly Offering archive at HathiTrust

1840 establishments in Massachusetts
1841 disestablishments in Massachusetts
Abolitionist newspapers published in the United States
Monthly magazines published in the United States
Defunct magazines published in the United States
Magazines established in 1840
Magazines disestablished in 1841
Magazines published in Boston